Ceratogyrus brachycephalus (greater horned baboon tarantula) is an old world terrestrial tarantula that grows to a legspan of up to 5 inches (12 cm). The common name comes from the "horn", or protuberance, on the carapace.

Distribution
C. brachycephalus is found in Botswana, Zimbabwe and South Africa.

Pet tarantula
Ceratogyrus brachycephalus is a relatively common tarantula for hobbyists to keep. It prefers to burrow, but in the absence of substrate to burrow it will web and make  web "tunnels". This species is extremely fast and aggressive; care must be taken when performing tank upkeep. Some people surmise that what is commonly called C. brachycephalus in the pet trade might actually be Ceratogyrus sanderi, or maybe a hybrid.

References

Theraphosidae
Spiders of Africa
Spiders described in 1919